A list of films produced in Egypt in 1948. For an A-Z list of films currently on Wikipedia, see :Category:Egyptian films.

External links
 Egyptian films of 1948 at the Internet Movie Database
 Egyptian films of 1948 elCinema.com

Lists of Egyptian films by year
1948 in Egypt
Lists of 1948 films by country or language